Puran or Purana and similar word Purna can mean:

 Puran or Purna mean 'complete' in Hindi and Sanskrit respectively, in words like Purna avatar, Purna Swaraj and Purna Yoga.
Purana, a type of Hindu Indian literature
Purana (cicada), a genus of cicadas (Homoptera, Cicadidae) indigenous to southeast Asia

Puran
Puran, a subdivision and a tehsil of Shangla District, North-West Frontier Province NWFP, Pakistan
Puran Appu, 1812–1848, a Sri Lankan historic figure
Puran Poli, a type of Indian sweet
Puran Bhagat, a temple at Taragarh near Dinanagar in Gurdaspur district, Punjab, India
Puran Rana Tharu, a Nepalese politician
Puran Bhatt, a renowned puppeteer of Rajasthan
Puran Singh Phartyal, Indian politician

Purana
 Purana (cicada), a genus of cicadas
 Purana nebulilinea, a cicada species from southeast Asia
Purana Mandir, a 1984 Hindi feature film
Purana Qila, Delhi, an old fort
Purana Kassapa (c. 5th or 4th centuries BCE), Indian ascetic teacher - contemporaneous with Mahavira and the Buddha
Purana Task Force, the name of a police investigation into the underworld of Melbourne, Australia
Purana pul, an old bridge which is a major landmark in Hyderabad, India